Managnese(II) selenide is an inorganic compound with the chemical formula MnSe. 

Manganese(II) selenide can be synthesized by the reaction of selenium powder and manganese(II) acetate in an alkaline solution with a reducing agent such as hydrazine at 180°C. 

Manganese selenide exists in three different polymorphs: the stable α-phase (NaCl type), the metastable γ-phase (wurtzite type) and unstable β phase (zincblende type).

References

Manganese(II) compounds
Selenides
Rock salt crystal structure